is a Japanese professional footballer who plays as a right back for J1 League club Urawa Red Diamonds and the Japan national team.

Club career

Kashiwa Reysol
Born in Kashiwa, Chiba, Japan, Sakai was introduced to football by his two older brothers and joined a school football team when he was the third grade of elementary school. He initially played as a striker before converting to a full back, where he has played since. Sakai spent 10 years with the school football team before joining Kashiwa Reysol U15 side in 2003.

Sakai progressed through the ranks of the Kashiwa Reysol and learned his guidance under Tatsuma Yoshida. Eventually, he worked his way through to the U16 and U18 side. During his progress, Sakai joined Mogimirin EC to study abroad on a short–term, though he said the experience benefited him to improve his right–back and centre–back positions, but returned to Japan in November 2009.

Ahead of the 2010 season, Sakai was promoted to the Kashiwa Reysol's first team, where he signed a contract with the club and was given a number 30 shirt. At the start of the 2010 season, he started out on the substitute bench in number of matches. It wasn't until on 5 May 2010 when he made his Kashiwa Reysol debut, coming on as a substitute for Yohei Kurakawa in the 77th minute, in a 1–1 draw against Ventforet Kofu. Sakai then made his first start for the side on 25 July 2010, starting the whole game and set up one of the goals, in a 2–2 draw against JEF United Chiba. It wasn't until on 31 October 2010 when he scored his first goal for the club, in a 4–1 win over Mito HollyHock. Although he was featured several times later in the season, Sakai went on to make 12 appearances and scoring once for the side.

Ahead of the 2011 season, the club announced that Sakai were among players to agree to stay at Kashiwa Reysol and was given a number 4 shirt. However, he missed the start of the season, due to a metatarsal fracture injury, causing to miss six matches. It wasn't until on 23 April 2011 when Sakai made his first appearance of the season, in a 1–0 win over Omiya Ardija. Sakai then quickly established himself in the starting eleven, playing in the right–back position. On 12 May 2011, it was announced that Sakai signed another contract with the club. Sakai began to set up goals in number of matches for the side, including twice against Kawasaki Frontale on 16 July 2011. Sakai later helped Kashiwa Reysol win the league and the club lifted the trophy after beating Urawa Red Diamonds 3–2 in the last game of the season. As a result, the club qualified for the FIFA Club World Cup as part of winning the league. Sakai played his first match of the tournament, starting the whole game, in the play-off for the quarter–finals, in a 2–0 win over Auckland City. Sakai then scored in the semi–final, in a 3–1 loss against Santos. He played four times in the tournament, as Kashiwa Reysol finished fourth place in the FIFA Club World Cup. At the end of the 2011 season, Sakai was awarded J. League Rookie of the Year and was named in the J. League Best XI. Despite being sidelined on several occasions later in the season, he made 35 appearances and scoring once in all competitions.

At the start of the 2012 season, Sakai started the season well when he helped Kashiwa Reysol win the Japanese Super Cup by beating FC Tokyo 2–1 on 3 March 2012. Three days after winning the Japanese Super Cup, he scored his first goal of the season in the AFC Champions League, in a 3–2 loss against Buriram United. Sakai scored and set up the club's third goal of the game, in a 3–3 draw against Yokohama F. Marinos in the opening game of the season. He continued to regain his first team place for the side this season, playing in the right–back position. His third goal of the season then came on 17 April 2012, in a 3–1 loss against Guangzhou Evergrande Taobao in the AFC Champions League. A month later, on 17 May 2012, Sakai set up two goals, in a 2–1 win over Cerezo Osaka. His performance attracted interests from clubs in Europe, mostly Germany, as the season progressed. With his move to Hannover 96 reached an agreement, Sakai made his last appearance for the club, which came on 30 June 2012, in a 6–2 win over Gamba Osaka. After his departure, he was given a farewell sendoff following an end of Kashiwa Reysol's match. Despite missing out one match by the time of his departure, Sakai went on to make 23 appearances and scoring 3 times in all competitions this season.

Hannover 96
It was announced on 13 June 2012 that Hannover 96 agreed to sign Sakai from Kashiwa Reysol. It was later confirmed with Sakai signing a four–year contract with the club, keeping him until 2016. The transfer reportedly cost 1 million euro (100 million yen).

However, at the start of the 2012–13 season, Sakai missed several matches, due to international commitment with Japan and his own injury concerns. It wasn't until on 31 August 2012 when he made his Hannover 96 debut in the Qualification Round Second Leg of the UEFA League Europa League and set up one of the goals, in a 5–1 win over Śląsk Wrocław. He then made his league debut on 23 September 2012, where he came on as a substitute from 16 minutes to the end of the game, in a 3–1 loss against 1899 Hoffenheim. However, Sakai's first team opportunities with Hannover 96 became limited and was on the substitute bench as a result. As the season progressed, Sakai began to receive more playing time for the last four matches. In his first season at Hannover 96, Sakai made 17 appearances in all competitions for the side.

Ahead of the 2013–14 season, Sakai was expected to compete in the right–back position with Steve Cherundolo once again. After Cherundolo injured his knee at the start of the season, he began to play in number of matches since the start of the season, playing in the right–back position. Sakai then scored his first goal for the club, in a 3–2 loss against Werder Bremen on 3 November 2013. In a follow–up match against local rivals’ Eintracht Braunschweig on 8 November 2013, he started and played the whole game to keep a clean sheet, in a 0–0 draw. However, Sakai soon lost his first team place around early–2014 and was placed on the substitute bench for several matches. He later returned to the starting lineup on 1 March 2014, in a 1–1 draw against FC Augsburg and regained his first team place for the rest of the season. Although he was sidelined on several occasions during the season, Sakai went on to make 28 appearances and scoring once in all competitions.

In the 2014–15 season, Sakai continued to regain his first team place in the right–back position following the retirement of Cherundolo. Sakai continued to regain his first team place until he lost it in February 2015 to João Pereira. Over the next months as the season progressed, Sakai and Pereira fight over the right–back position. Sakai won the first team place despite being suspended on two occasions, including one when he was sent–off bookable offence, in a 2–1 win over FC Augsburg on 16 May 2015. Despite suffering from injuries during the season,

Ahead of the 2015–16 season, Sakai was linked with a move away from Hannover 96, as clubs like Napoli and other clubs among interested. Eventually, he stayed at the club throughout the summer transfer window. At the start of the season, Sakai continued to regain his first team place in the right–back position. This lasted until mid-September when he suffered a strain on his thigh and missed out two matches. It wasn't until on 18 October 2015 when he returned from injury, coming on as a second–half substitute, in a 1–0 win over 1. FC Köln. Sakai was then sidelined again between late–November and early–December when he suffered injuries for the second time this season. Since returning from injuries, Sakai regained back his first team place in the right–back position. He then scored his first goal of the season on 23 April 2016, in a 2–2 draw against FC Ingolstadt 04. However, the draw resulted the club being relegated to 2. Bundesliga after a 14-year stay in Bundesliga. Shortly after, Sakai missed the rest of the season with a muscle injury. At the end of the 2015–16 season, he went on to make 28 appearances and scoring once in all competitions.

Following Hannover 96's relegation, Sakai expressed his desire to leave the club.

Olympique de Marseille
After Hannover 96 relegation, Sakai moved to Ligue 1 side Marseille on a free transfer on 23 June 2016. It was revealed that his then national team Manager Vahid Halilhodžić convinced him to join Olympique de Marseille. In addition, Sakai became the second Japanese player to join Olympique de Marseille since Kōji Nakata. Upon joining the club, he was given a number two shirt ahead of the new season.

Sakai made his Olympique de Marseille debut in the opening game of the season, where he set up a goal for Florian Thauvin, in a 4–0 win over Toulouse. He quickly established himself in the starting eleven for the side, playing in the right–back position. This was due to the fact that Sakai was the only player to play in the right–back position. At one point, Sakai played in the right–midfield position once during the season against rivals against Paris Saint-Germain on 23 October 2016. Despite being absent on three occasions during the season, Sakai went on to make 40 appearances in all competitions. In his first season at Olympique de Marseille, his teammate Florian Thauvin and Manager Rudi Garcia both praised his commitment and performance when the club were in a financial problems during the season.

At the start of the 2017–18 season, Sakai continued to establish himself in the starting eleven for the side, playing in the right–back position despite finding himself in a competition with Bouna Sarr over the right–back position. He stated in an interview with France Football that he has settled in France, having suffered difficulties in his previous season. His performance in a 2–0 win over Toulouse on 24 September 2017 led him to be named Team of the Week. Following good performance for the side this season so far, Sakai signed a four–year contract with the club, keeping him until 2021, on 29 September 2017. Having played in the right–back position in the first half of the season, Sakai switched to playing in the left–back position following the departure of Patrice Evra and injury of Jordan Amavi. He spent the next six matches, playing in the left–back position before returning to his original position. During a 3–2 loss against Lyon on 18 March 2018, he suffered an injury in the first–half and was substituted as a result, leading him to be sidelined between 7–10 days. He made his return from injury on 5 April 2018 in the quarter–final of the UEFA Europa League first leg, in a 1–0 loss to RB Leipzig. On 12 April 2018 (which was his 28th birthday), Sakai scored his first UEFA Europa League goal in the quarter–final return leg, in a 5–2 win over RB Leipzig to progress into the next round and a 5–3 aggregate victory. Nine days later after the win, he sustained an injury during a 5–1 win over Lille and was substituted in the first half as a result; which he was sidelined for three weeks. Despite recovering from his injury in mid–May, Sakai, however, was featured on the substitute bench throughout 90 minutes, as Marseille lost 3–0 to Atlético Madrid in the UEFA Europa League Final. At the end of the 2017–18 season, Sakai finished the season, making 50 appearances and scoring twice in all competitions.

At the end of the 2020–21 season he announced he was leaving the club (he eventually signed for Urawa Red Diamonds in the J. League 1).

International career

Youth
In June 2011, Sakai was called up by Japan U23 squad for the first time. He made his Japan U23 on the same day, in a 3–1 win over Australia U23. It wasn't until on 23 June 2011 when he scored his first goal for the U23 side, in second leg of the Asian Qualifiers Preliminary Round of the Summer Olympics, in a 2–1 loss against Kuwait U23, but Japan won 4–3 on aggregate. After making his U23 debut, Sakai became a regular for the U23 throughout the year in the right–back position. It wasn't until on 22 February 2012 when he scored and set up one of the goals, in a 4–0 win over Malaysia U23.

On 2 July 2012, Sakai was called up for the 2012 Summer Olympics Football tournament in London. He started in a match, where he played 74 minutes before being substituted, in a 1–0 win over Spain U23. Sakai went on to start three more matches in the tournament, as Japan U23 reached the semi–finals and finished fourth place.

Sakai was named as one of Japan's three over-age players for the 2020 Summer Olympics on home soil, alongside Maya Yoshida and Wataru Endo.

Senior
In October 2011, Sakai was called up for the first time to the senior squad for a match against Vietnam and Tajikistan, but did not play and was on the substitute bench instead. After eight months since being called up to the national team, Sakai made his debut for the side, where he played 45 minutes, in a 2–0 win over Azerbaijan in the Kirin Challenge Cup on 23 May 2012. By April 2012, Sakai began to adjust playing under Manager Alberto Zaccheroni, having understood his tactics and management. For the rest of 2012, Sakai continued to feature in several matches for the side.

In 2013, Sakai began to compete with Atsuto Uchida over the right–back position, which saw both of them each winning the position in number of matches. He featured two of the three matches, all of them result in losses, in the 2013 Confederations Cup squad. After the end of the Confederations Cup tournament, Sakai then started the next six Japan international matches in the absence of Uchida, who suffered a torn tendon and was sidelined for the 2013–14 season.

In May 2014, Sakai was named in Japan's preliminary squad for the 2014 FIFA World Cup in Brazil. In the end, he made it to the final cut for the 23-man squad. However, Sakai made no appearances in the World Cup, as he spent the rest of the campaign on the substitute bench. After the tournament ended, Sakai made his first appearance for the side in three months on 5 September 2014, in a 2–0 loss against Uruguay. However, he was absent from the AFC Asian Cup tournament under a new management of Javier Aguirre.

After Uchida's absent in recent matches of 2015, Sakai began to make an impact to keep his first team place for the national side. For the next two years, Sakai established himself in the right–back position and started in every match he played.

In May 2018, Sakai was named in Japan's preliminary squad for the FIFA World Cup in Russia. Eventually, he made it to the final cut of the 23 men squad. Sakai made his World Cup debut against Colombia in Matchday 1 of the Group Stage, where he played the whole game, in a 2–1 win.

Personal life
In 2014, Sakai revealed that he married a non-celebrity woman and described her as supportive of his football career. It was announced in November 2014 that he would become a father and his wife gave birth to a baby girl in January 2015.

Sakai is a fan of Miso soup and once said: "Take only miso soup because miso soup is a necessity for me." After moving to Hannover 96 in 2012, Sakai began learning German and currently learning twice a week and English. Since moving to Europe, Sakai spoke out the culture in Germany and France.

In May 2018, Sakai published his first book titled "Resetting Power 'Nature and the Mind Becomes Stronger' 46 Concept".

Career statistics

Club

International

Scores and results list Japan's goal tally first, score column indicates score after each Sakai goal.

Honours
Kashiwa Reysol
J. League Division 1: 2011
J. League Division 2: 2010
Japanese Super Cup: 2012

Marseille
UEFA Europa League runner-up: 2017–18

Urawa Red Diamonds
Emperor's Cup: 2021
Japanese Super Cup: 2022

Japan
AFC Asian Cup runner-up: 2019

Individual
J. League Rookie of the Year: 2011
J. League Best XI : 2011
Olympique de Marseille Player of the Season: 2018–19

References

External links

 
 

 Hiroki Sakai at Yahoo! Japan Sports 
 
 

1990 births
Living people
People from Kashiwa
Association football people from Chiba Prefecture
Japanese footballers
Association football defenders
J1 League players
J2 League players
Bundesliga players
Ligue 1 players
Kashiwa Reysol players
Hannover 96 players
Olympique de Marseille players
Urawa Red Diamonds players
Olympic footballers of Japan
Footballers at the 2012 Summer Olympics
Japan international footballers
2013 FIFA Confederations Cup players
2014 FIFA World Cup players
2018 FIFA World Cup players
2019 AFC Asian Cup players
2022 FIFA World Cup players
Footballers at the 2020 Summer Olympics
Japanese expatriate footballers
Japanese expatriate sportspeople in Germany
Japanese expatriate sportspeople in France
Expatriate footballers in Germany
Expatriate footballers in France